Ricarda Bauernfeind (born 1 April 2000) is a German professional road cyclist, who currently rides for UCI Women's WorldTeam .

Major results
2018
 3rd Road race, National Junior Road Championships
2021
 3rd Road race, National Road Championships
 10th Road race, European Under-23 Road Championships
2022
 European Under-23 Road Championships
1st  Mixed team time trial
5th Time trial
 National Under-23 Road Championships
1st  Road race
1st  Time trial
 1st Visegrad 4 Ladies Race Slovakia
 2nd Road race, National Road Championships
 UCI Under-23 Road World Championships
3rd  Road race
3rd  Time trial
 3rd Overall Tour Féminin International des Pyrénées
1st Young rider classification
 3rd Overall Vuelta Ciclista Andalucia Ruta Del Sol
 4th Grand Prix Féminin de Chambéry
 4th Visegrad 4 Ladies Race Hungary
 5th Overall Thüringen Ladies Tour

References

External links

2000 births
Living people
German female cyclists
Sportspeople from Ingolstadt